In Praise of Older Women... and Other Crimes is the fifth studio album released by the American musical group Kid Creole and the Coconuts. It was released in 1985 and includes the singles "Endicott" and "Caroline Was a Drop-Out". The album and its lead single "Caroline Was a Drop-Out" did not chart in any territory, but the second single "Endicott" became one of the group's better known songs in the US, where it peaked at #21 on the Hot Dance Club Play chart. The single also reached the top 30 in France and the Netherlands.

"You Can't Keep a Good Man Down" is a remake of the Gichy Dan's Beachwood #9 song from their self-titled 1979 album. The original recording was written and co-produced by Darnell. Gichy Dan also provides backing vocals on In Praise of Older Women... and Other Crimes.

Reception

In Praise of Older Women... and Other Crimes received mixed reviews from critics. Zach Curd writing for AllMusic gave the album a mixed review. He calls the album a weaker example of the "disco/calypso/funk/Latin" genres. He also describes the album overall as entertaining, humorous, fun, and worth buying for the feel-good, "Endicott".

In a positive review, Robert Christgau, writing for The Village Voice, positively compares Darnell to Cole Porter and hails him for maintaining a consistent level of lyrical sophistication that in the rock or musical comedy genres. He does, however, criticize the amount of brittle satire on the album. Christgau also singles out Andy Hernandez's attack on white-collar crime "Dowopsalsaboprock".

Track listing

Personnel

Performer credits
Adriana Kaegi, Cheryl Poirier, Taryn Hagey – The Coconuts
Bongo Eddie, Carol Colman, Charlie Lagond, Coati Mundi, Dave Span, Jimmy Rippetoe (A Parttime Student Who Comes & Goes At Whim), Ken Fradley, King Creole (Self-Appointed In Feb. This Year), Lee Robertson (The Professor), Mark Mazur, Peter Schott, Ronnie Rogers – The Band, as it exists in the year of 1985
Ken Fradley – trumpet solo (3)
Charlie Lagond – solo (6)
St Winifred's School Choir – choir (10)
Cory Daye – lead vocal harmonies and interjections
Dutch Robinson, Lori Mosher – additional background vocals
Carolyn Browder, Gichy Dan – provided additional background vocals
Sugar-Coated Andy Hernandez (2, 4, 5, 9), Carlos Franzetti (1, 5), Ken Fradley (8) – horn arrangements

Technical credits
August Darnell – producer
Carol Colman – production coordinator
Joe Barbaria (1-4, 6-8, 10) – engineer
Julian McBrowne (5, 9) – engineer
Michel Sauvage (1-4, 6-8, 10) – assistant engineer
Tim Purvis (5, 9) - assistant engineer
Argyle Kneft and Steven Stanley (1-6), Argyle Kneft, Coati Mundi and Julian McBrowne (5, 9), Augie and Joe-Bob (7, 8, 10) – mixing
Bob Ludwig – mastering
John Rynski – art direction
Donald Schneider – artwork
Iksmir Noj – rear cover

Charts
"Endicott"

References

1985 albums
Kid Creole and the Coconuts albums
Sire Records albums